Ryan Unzicker (born July 9, 1981) is an American professional racing driver who competes in dirt track racing as well as part-time in the ARCA Menards Series, driving the No. 24 Chevrolet SS for Hendren Motorsports.

Racing career

Unzicker made his debut in what was then known as the ARCA Re/Max Series in 2003 in the race at the Illinois State Fairgrounds Racetrack (Springfield). He returned to the series in 2011 and has every year since then as a dirt ringer, running the races at Springfield and the DuQuoin State Fairgrounds Racetrack. He has won two races in the series, the first being at Springfield in 2020 and the second being at DuQuoin in 2022. The race at DuQuoin in 2022 was also the final race for his team, Hendren Motorsports, as car owner Bill Hendren retired after the season.

Motorsports career results

ARCA Menards Series
(key) (Bold – Pole position awarded by qualifying time. Italics – Pole position earned by points standings or practice time. * – Most laps led.)

References

External links
  
 

ARCA Menards Series drivers
Racing drivers from Illinois
1981 births
Living people
People from El Paso, Illinois